James Dominic Grunwell (born 4 February 1989) is a British racing driver, who has lived most of his life in Thailand.

2003

In early 2003, James entered his first official race where the Champion Racing Team was formed under the support of Champion Ferodo.

At the age of 14, James entered The Thailand Under 18 100cc Veloil Challenge and won its championship.  He then later entered the Thailand Nationals in the Yamaha class and won 2 out of 4 races with podiums in the other 2.  He continued to enter kart races with the 2003 kart, and still managed to finish the season 4th in the internationally recognized Intercon ‘A’ Class.  James finished on the podium in every race he entered.

2004

Towards the end of 2004, James had an opportunity of a test drive with AIM Racing, one of Thailand’s leading racing teams.  He passed with flying colors as the fastest rookie ever to take the test.  He was immediately entered for the last two races of 2004 as a guest driver.  He drove a specially designed Thai built car that ran with 12 valve, 1600cc, Toyota racing engines that produces top speeds of up to 160 km/h.  He competed in 4 out of 6 races in the new season, finishing first twice and had a podium place in the rest.

In December 2004, James was invited for a test drive in a Formula BMW, with the Meritus Racing Team in Malaysia.  Again he passed the test and was offered a drive with them in 2005.  He entered the Formula BMW scholarship programme and missed out by one place for the scholarship.  James and his sponsors decided to concentrate on karting in Thailand.

2004–2006

Grunwell won all the races in Thailand Rotax Max Junior series.  He later entered the World Finals in Langkawi for Rotax Max.  In Langkawi, James finished in the top 5 in all races and started 4th on the grid in the final.  He was the highest placed Thai driver ever.

At the end of 2005, James again joined the Formula BMW Asia scholarship program and this time – having matured a little and with some more experience – passed with flying colors.  He won one of 4 prestigious BMW Scholarship prizes worth USD 50,000 and managed to get bonus points for setting the fastest lap out of 20 competitors.

In 2006 Meritus Racing Team took James on as a Rookie driver to compete in the Formula BMW Asia series where he finished 3rd in the Rookie Championship and 4th overall.

2007–2008
In 2007 Grunwell spent a second year in Formula BMW Asia for Meritus Racing Team. He finished third in points with three wins among 12 podium finishes. In 2008 Grunwell raced in Formula V6 Asia for Team Meritus and won the championship, capturing four wins and finishing on the podium in all but two of the twelve races. However, despite the 2008 success, Grunwell has not appeared in a professional motor race since that time.

Advertising and sponsorship

All through 2005 and 2006, James has been featured in many magazines and newspapers.  James also appeared with his Concept Car at the Bangkok 7th Rugby Tournament on behalf of his sponsors Champion Ferodo, where he did a demonstration drive by and helped present the prize to the winners of the tournament.

In 2007, The Pizza Company became one of the main sponsors for James in the Formula BMW Asia Series followed by Comcon Services Thailand and Image Makers Asia, and James has been actively promoting both companies in Thailand and abroad.

James is based in Thailand and is currently racing throughout Asia where he currently leads the Formula BMW Asian Championship after winning races in Malaysia and Indonesia.

Sources
,*

Boudreau, Mark , F1 Prospect, January 28, 2006, Accessed July 31,

External links
Official Web Site
James' Blog

1983 births
Living people
British racing drivers
British expatriates in Thailand
Formula V6 Asia drivers
Formula BMW Asia drivers
Formula BMW ADAC drivers
Team Meritus drivers